The 4th Senate district of Wisconsin is one of 33 districts in the Wisconsin State Senate.  Located in southeast Wisconsin, the district is entirely contained within northern Milwaukee County.  It comprises part of the city of Milwaukee's north side, as well as the village of Shorewood, the southern half of the city of Glendale, and part of northern Wauwatosa.

Current elected officials
Lena Taylor is the senator representing the 4th district. She was first elected in the 2004 general election, and is now serving her fifth term.  Prior to her election as senator, she was a member of the State Assembly, representing the 18th Assembly district from 2003 to 2005.

Each Wisconsin State Senate district is composed of three State Assembly districts.  The 4th Senate district comprises the 10th, 11th, and 12th Assembly districts. The current representatives of those districts are: 
 Assembly District 10: Darrin Madison (D–Milwaukee)
 Assembly District 11: Dora Drake (D–Milwaukee)
 Assembly District 12: LaKeshia Myers (D–Milwaukee)

The district is located within Wisconsin's 4th congressional district, which is represented by U.S. Representative Gwen Moore.

Past senators
At the time of the creation of the state of Wisconsin, the 4th Senate District was defined in the Constitution as consisting of Fond du Lac and Winnebago counties.
In the first two sessions of the state legislature, the 4th District was represented by:
Warren Chase, 1848–1849 (Democrat) of Ceresco. He joined the new Free Soil Party, and ran in 1849 (unsuccessfully) as the Free Soil candidate for Governor. He was succeeded by
John A. Eastman, 1850–1851 (Democrat) of Fond du Lac
Bertine Pinckney, 1852 (Whig) of Rosendale

The Senate was redistricted from 19 to 25 districts before the 1853 session; the old 4th Senate District was now the 20th and 21st Districts, and the new 4th District consisted of the Towns of Erin, Richfield, Germantown, Jackson, Polk, Hartford, Addison, West Bend, Newark, Trenton, Farmington, Kewaskum and Wayne, in Washington County, formerly part of the original 11th District. The new 4th was represented by:
Baruch Schleisinger Weil, 1853 (Democrat) of West Bend
Baltus Mantz, 1854 (Democrat) of Meeker (died in office of cholera)
James Rolfe, 1855 (independent) 
Baruch Schleisinger Weil, 1856 now living in Schleisingerville

For the 1857 session, the Senate was expanded to 30 seats; the new 4th district included all of Washington County now, and once more elected: 
Baruch Schleisinger Weil, 1857 
Densmore Maxon, 1858–1861 (Democrat) of Cedar Creek

As of 1862, the Senate expanded to 33 seats, a size it would retain well into the 21st century; the 4th District remained unchanged. It elected:
Frederick Thorpe, 1862–1867 (Democrat) of West Bend
Adam Schantz, 1868–1871 (Democrat) of Addison

In 1871, the Senate was drastically redistricted. Washington County became part of a revised 33rd District. A new 4th District was created, consisting of Monroe and Vernon Counties (formerly parts of the 31st and 30th Districts respectively). This new district elected:
William Nelson, 1872–1873 (Republican) of Viroqua
Adelbert Bleekman, 1874–1875 (Republican) of Tomah

In 1876, the District lost Monroe County, and gained Crawford County instead. The new district elected:
J. Henry Tate, 1876–1877 (Republican) of Viroqua
George W. Swain, 1878–1879 (Republican) of Chaseburg
Ormsby Thomas, 1880–1881 (Republican) of Prairie du Chien
Van S. Bennett, 1882–1883 (Republican) of Rockton
 Joseph W. Hoyt, 1885–1888 (Republican) of Chaseburg

In 1887, the Senate districts were again totally revamped; the new 4th District consisted of the 1st, 6th, 9th, 13th and 18th Wards of Milwaukee (the old 4th was split between new 16th and 31st Districts). It elected 
 John J. Kempf, 1889–1892 (Republican)

In 1891 and 1892, the Senate was redistricted; after lawsuits, the 4th District lost the 6th and 9th Wards, gaining the 3rd and 7th Wards instead. It elected: 
James W. Murphy, 1893–1894 (Democrat) of Milwaukee
James C. Officer, 1895–1896 (Republican) of Milwaukee

By 1896, the Milwaukee portion of the 4th District had been reduced to the 6th, 13th, 18th and 21st Wards, but it gained Whitefish Bay, and the Towns of Granville and Milwaukee.
J. Herbert Green, 1897–1903 (Republican) of Milwaukee

After the 1901 redistricting, the 4th consisted of Milwaukee's 1st, 13th, 18th and 21st Wards and added the Villages of East Milwaukee and North Milwaukee.
J. Herbert Green was re-elected in 1902 from the new district
Henry Bodenstab, 1909–1912 (Republican) of Milwaukee
William L. Richards, 1913–1916 (Republican)of Milwaukee
Herman C. Schultz, 1917–1920 (Republican) of Milwaukee
Oscar Morris, 1921–1938 (Republican) of Milwaukee

After the 1921 redistricting, the 4th lost Milwaukee's 1st Ward, but gained its 25th, and lost Granville and North Milwaukee (the former East Milwaukee was now Shorewood). This district re-elected Morris for over a decade to come. By the 1931 redistricting, the City of Milwaukee portion of the 4th was reduced to the 13th, 18th and 21st Wards, but the district included the Town of Milwaukee and the village of Shorewood, plus the addition of the villages of Fox Point and River Hills. It continued to elect Oscar Morris until his 1939 death in office.
Milton T. Murray, 1939–1944 (Republican) of Milwaukee
John C. McBride, 1945–1948 (Republican) of Milwaukee
George A. Mayer, 1949–1952 (Republican) of Milwaukee
Harry F. Franke Jr., 1953–1956 (Republican) of Milwaukee

The 1950s was a period of redistricting plans, referendums and lawsuits. By 1954, the 4th District still had three Milwaukee Wards (the 1st, 18th and 20th), Fox Point, River Hills, Shorewood, and Whitefish Bay, and added Bayside, Brown Deer, and Glendale (which between them had absorbed all of the old Town of Milwaukee). This new 4th District elected:
Kirby Hendee, 1957–1960 (Republican) of Milwaukee
Jerris Leonard, 1961–1969 (Republican) of Milwaukee

After more lawsuits and failure by the legislature to act, in 1964 the Wisconsin Supreme Court reapportioned the legislative districts for the 1964
elections. The 3rd and 18th Wards of the City of Milwaukee, the part of Bayside in Milwaukee County, Brown Deer, Fox Point, River Hills, Shorewood and Whitefish Bay became the new 4th.
Jerris Leonard was re-elected from the new district.
Nile Soik, 1969–1973 (Republican) of Whitefish Bay

In 1971, the legislature was reapportioned without incident. The new 4th encompassed the seven North Shore suburbs, but also Thiensville, Mequon, and eight townships in Southeastern Washington County, from Erin in the southwest to Farmington in the northeast. This new district elected:
Bob Kasten, 1973–1974 (Republican) of Brown Deer, who left when he was elected to Congress. A special election was held, electing:
Jim Sensenbrenner, 1975-1979 (Republican) of Shorewood, who in turn resigned when he was elected to Kasten's old seat in Congress. He was succeeded in another special election by:
Rod Johnston, 1979–1984 (Republican) of Whitefish Bay

In 1984, an election was held under a plan passed by the legislature in 1983, under which the 4th consisted of the North Shore suburbs east of Brown Deer and Glendale, plus part of Milwaukee's inner city and the East Side of Milwaukee east of the Milwaukee River south to where the river flows into Milwaukee's harbor. 
Barbara Ulichny, 1985–1993 (Democrat) of Milwaukee

A 1992 court-ordered redistricting moved most of the district west of the Milwaukee River, except for Glendale and part of Shorewood, and added a large slice of the inner city, extending at its westmost to the county line with Waukesha County. This new 4th elected:
Gwen Moore, 1993–2004 (Democrat) of Milwaukee

A new court-ordered map was created in 2002, by which the District was moved even further west into the inner city and out to 124th Street. In 2004, it elected Lena Taylor, the present incumbent. The 2011 redistricting expanded the portion of the district in the inner city, while still retaining Shorewood and part of Glendale. Taylor was re-elected from that district in 2012.

Note: the boundaries of districts have changed over history. Previous politicians of a specific numbered district have represented a completely different geographic area, due to redistricting.

See also

 Political subdivisions of Wisconsin

Notes

External links
4th Senate District, Senator Taylor in the Wisconsin Blue Book (2005–2006)

Wisconsin State Senate districts
Milwaukee County, Wisconsin
1848 establishments in Wisconsin